Karamjit Singh (born 29 January 1962), also known as the Flying Sikh, is a Malaysian professional race driver in rallying, and was the first Asian driver to win the Fédération Internationale de l'Automobile (FIA) Production Car World Championship for Drivers, doing so on his first try. He has been rallying professionally since 1985. He has won the 2001 Asia Pacific Rally Championship for Drivers, the 2002 FIA Production Car World Championship for Drivers, as well as the 2002 and 2004 FIA Asia Pacific Rally Championship for Drivers. He has raced for the Petronas EON Racing Team and Team Proton Pert Malaysia using Proton 4WD rally cars. His co-drivers have been (in chronological order) Ron Teoh, Allen Oh and John Bennie. Karamjit is currently racing a 2WD Proton Satria Neo CPS R3 for the CUSCO Japan team in the Asia Pacific Rally Championships in 2011 after moving from the Proton R3 Malaysia Rally Team

Sponsorship difficulties
In 2005, Singh began facing trouble in finding sponsors, and was unable to participate in half out of the eight rounds in the FIA Asia Pacific Rally Championship. His team itself did not have enough money to pay for mechanics and maintenance of his vehicle, and due to his absence from so many rounds in the championship, the FIA slapped him with a fine of 10,000 Euros. Singh did not even have enough money to ship his vehicle back to Malaysia from New Zealand, which itself would cost about RM57,000. Singh's plight made the headlines of a few newspapers in Malaysia, who had been informed that Singh was in the process of selling off his apartment to pay his fine and ship his car home.

When informed about the possibility of receiving public or government assistance, Singh refused such offers, stating that he believed he could find enough corporate sponsors to avoid burdening the public. Rather than accepting assistance from individuals, Singh said he would consider racing for another country. When informed, the Prime Minister of Malaysia, Abdullah Ahmad Badawi reportedly asked: "If Karamjit is a Malaysian and has been producing results and bringing honour to the country, why has support not been accorded to him?"

The Malaysian Sports Minister, Azalina Othman Said, was also reported as stating that she had been ordered to look into the matter, and that "we want to find out why the private sector have not come forward and secondly, if Karamjit has someone to manage him and put forward his cause in the right perspective so sponsors can come forward and use the spin-off from their association."

Sponsorship resolved (July 2007)
After a couple of year partial absence from the rally arena, now Karamjit Singh has the opportunities to have a kickback in action via a new management and sponsorship. Teamed up with corporate entities (Aldwich Berhad), Karamjit has starting a new team known as Team Templer Motorsport. And Also A Logistic Company In PJ sponsored. Alps Freight Logistics.

WRC results

References

External links
Ooi, Jeff (2005). "Corporate Malaysia? Kick ass those arse-lickers!". Retrieved 2 November 2005.
Tan, Paul (2005). "Government to help Karamjit". Retrieved 2 November 2005
Tan, Paul (2005). "Karamjit will not be able to defend APRC title". Retrieved 2 November 2005.
Tan, Paul (2005). "Why Can't Karamjit Singh Secure Sponsorship?". Retrieved 2 November 2005.
Van der Zee, Tjeerd (2005). "Karamjit Singh". Retrieved 2 November 2005.
PenyuSukan (2018). "Karamjit Singh Terpantas Hari Pertama Kejuaraan Rali Terengganu 2018". Retrieved 14 Disember 2018.

1962 births
Malaysian people of Indian descent
Living people
Malaysian rally drivers
Malaysian Sikhs
Malaysian people of Punjabi descent